Euphaedra jolyana is a butterfly in the family Nymphalidae. It is found in the north-western part of the Democratic Republic of the Congo.

References

Butterflies described in 1986
jolyana
Endemic fauna of the Democratic Republic of the Congo
Butterflies of Africa